Senator Allen may refer to:

Members of the United States Senate
George Allen (American politician) (born 1952), U.S. Senator from Virginia from 2001 to 2007
Henry Justin Allen (1868–1950), U.S. Senator from Kansas from 1929 to 1930
James Allen (Alabama politician) (1912–1978), U.S. senator from Alabama from 1969 to 1978
John B. Allen (1845–1903), U.S. Senator from Washington from 1889 to 1893
Maryon Pittman Allen (1925–2018), U.S. Senator from Alabama in 1978
Philip Allen (Rhode Island politician) (1785–1865), U.S. Senator from Rhode Island from 1853 to 1859
William V. Allen (1847–1924), U.S. Senator from Nebraska from 1899 to 1901
William Allen (governor) (1803–1879), U.S. Senator from Ohio from 1837 to 1849

United States state senate members
Aris T. Allen (1910–1991), Maryland State Senate
Ben Allen (California politician) (born 1978), California State Senate
Benjamin Allen (Wisconsin politician) (1807–1873), Wisconsin State Senate
Carolyn Allen (1937–2016), Arizona State Senate
Charles Herbert Allen (1848–1934), Massachusetts State Senate
Charles Allen (Massachusetts politician) (1797–1869), Massachusetts State Senate
Chaz Allen (born 1970), Iowa State Senate
Clifford Allen (1912–1978), Tennessee State Senate
Diane Allen (born 1948), New Jersey State Senate
Dorathy M. Allen (1910–1990), Arkansas State Senate
Ethan B. Allen (1781–1835), New York State Senate
Frank G. Allen (1874–1950), Massachusetts State Senate
Fred J. Allen (1865–1918), Maine State Senate
Frederick Allen (Maine politician) (1914–2001), Maine State Senate
Gerald Allen (politician) (born 1950), Alabama State Senate
Gordon P. Allen (1929–2010), North Carolina State Senate
Jason Allen (politician), Michigan State Senate
John J. Allen (judge) (1797–1871), Virginia State Senate
John W. Allen (1802–1887), Ohio State Senate
John Allen (soldier) (1771–1813), Kentucky State Senate
Joseph Allen (Maine politician) (fl. 1900s–1910s), Maine State Senate
Karl B. Allen (born 1960), South Carolina State Senate
Mark Allen (politician), Oklahoma State Senate
Martin F. Allen (1842–1927), Vermont State Senate
Nelson Allen (1933–2005), Kentucky State Senate
Norman M. Allen (1828–1909), New York State Senate
Philip K. Allen (1910–1996), Massachusetts State Senate
Richard J. Allen (politician) (born 1933), Michigan State Senate
Robert E. Allen (politician) (1924–2014), Colorado State Senate
Robert Allen (Virginia politician) (1794–1859), Virginia State Senate
Samuel Clesson Allen (1772–1842), Massachusetts State Senate
Stephen Allen (1767–1852), New York State Senate
Sylvia Allen (born 1947), Arizona State Senate
Thomas Allen (representative) (1813–1882), Missouri State Senate
Victor M. Allen (1870–1916), New York State Senate
William J. Allen (1829–1901), Illinois State Senate
William S. Allen (1857–1926), Iowa State Senate
Willis Allen (1806–1859), Illinois State Senate

See also
Edgar Allan (1842–1904), Virginia State Senate